is a private university in Chiyoda, Tokyo, Japan.

Campuses

Kanda Campus (Main campus): 3-8 Kandajimbo-cho, Chiyoda, Tokyo 101-8425
The Kanda Campus is situated in Jimbocho, a college community in central Tokyo. This urban campus consists of several buildings, including the newly established Law School.
Ikuta Campus:  2-1-1 Higashi-mita, Tama-ku, Kawasaki, Kanagawa 214-8580
The Ikuta Campus is reached by ascending a steep hill.

Organization

Undergraduate faculties

Daytime divisions
School of Economics
Department of Economics
Department of International Economics
School of Law
Department of Law
Department of Politics
School of Business Administration
Department of Business Administration
School of Commerce
Department of Marketing
Department of Accounting
School of Literature
Department of Japanese Language
Department of Japanese Literature and Culture
Department of English
Department of Philosophy
Department of History
Department of Geography
Department of Liberal Arts and Journalism
School of Human Sciences
Department of Psychology
Department of Sociology
School of Network and Information
Department of Network and Information

Evening divisions
School of Economics
Department of Economics
School of Law
Department of Law
School of Commerce
Department of Marketing

Graduate schools
Graduate School of Economics
Graduate School of Law
Graduate School of Humanities
Graduate School of Business Administration
Graduate School of Commerce

Professional schools
 Law school

Research institutes

Institute for Social Sciences
Institute for Accounting Studies
Imamura Institute of Legal Studies
Institute of Business Administration
Institute for Commercial Sciences
Institute for the Humanities
Law Institute
Institute of Sports, Physical Education and Recreation
Institute of Information Science
Institute of Natural Sciences
Psychological Counseling Center
Institute for Development of Social Intelligence

History

The university was founded in September 1880, as Senshu College. The former Senshu College was the first school in Japan comprising Economics and Law Departments to systematically offer a specialized educational curriculum in the Japanese language.

Notable graduates

Politicians
 Tokuo Yamashita (Minister of Transport, Chief Cabinet Secretary, was Minister of Health, Labour, and Welfare)
 Yasukazu Hamada (Minister of Defense)
 Hiroshi Hase (Minister of Education, Culture, Sports, Science and Technology, professional wrestler (1986–2006))
 Hideo Higashikokubaru (Governor of Miyazaki)

Art
 Futabatei Shimei (author)
 Tetsurō Araki (animation director)  
 Atsushi Kaneko (manga artist (Known for Bambi and Her Pink Gun, Soil))

Sports
 Kento Sugiyama (baseball player)
 Hiroki Kuroda (baseball player)
 Yuya Hasegawa (baseball player)
 Tetsuya Matsumoto (baseball player)
 Hideko Hiranaka (medley swimmer)
 Wataru Murata (rugby player and coach)
 Ryo Adachi (football player and manager)
 Jun Wada (football player)
 Takuya Ito (football player)
 Takumi Nagura (football player)
 Kazuki Nagasawa (football player)
 Takashi Sato (mixed martial artist)
 Keito Yamakita (mixed martial artist)

Agreements with other universities

Participant in the Kanda 5 Universities
Senshu University
Chuo University
Hosei University
Meiji University
Nihon University
Tokyo 12 Universities
Senshu University
Aoyama Gakuin University
Chuo University
Hosei University
Keio University
Kokugakuin University
Meiji University
Nihon University
Sophia University
Rikkyo University (Saint Paul's University)
Tokai University
Waseda University
Participant in the Chiyoda Universities
Senshu University
Otsuma Women's University
Kyoritsu Women's University
Sophia University
Tokyo Kaseigakuin College
Tokyo Denki University
Nishogakusha University
Nihon University
Nippon Dental University
Hosei University
Meiji University
 Participant in the Tama-ku, Kawasaki 3 Universities
Senshu University
Meiji University
Japan Women's University

Sister schools

United States
 University of Nebraska–Lincoln
 Susquehanna University
 University of Illinois at Urbana–Champaign
 University of Oregon

Canada
 University of Calgary

Mexico
 Universidad Iberoamericana

United Kingdom
 University of Bristol

Ireland
 Trinity College Dublin

France
 Lumière University Lyon 2

Germany
 Martin Luther University of Halle-Wittenberg

Spain
 University of Barcelona

Australia
 University of Technology, Sydney
 University of Wollongong

New Zealand
 University of Waikato

South Korea
 Dankook University

China
 Shanghai University
 Northwest University
 Peking University

Taiwan
 National Sun Yat-sen University

Mongolia
 National University of Mongolia

Vietnam
 National Economics University

Language training institutes
 Institut de Touraine, France
 Goethe-Institut Bremen, Germany
 Yonsei University Korean Language Institute, South Korea
 CIE Oxford, United Kingdom

Affiliated schools
The university is affiliated with the following schools and universities in Japan.

 Ishinomaki Senshu University (Miyagi Prefecture)
 Hokkaido College, Senshu University (Hokkaido)
 Senshu University High School (Tokyo)
 Senshu University Matsudo High School and Junior High School (Chiba Prefecture)
 Senshu University Kitakami High School (Iwate Prefecture)
 Senshu University Tamana High School (Kumamoto Prefecture)

References

External links
 

Private universities and colleges in Japan
Senshu University
American football in Japan
Kantoh Collegiate American Football Association Top 8 university
1880 establishments in Japan
Educational institutions established in 1880
Universities and colleges in Tokyo